Jiří Hála (born 30 June 1972 in České Budějovice) is a former Czech ice hockey player and current sport director at HC Steelers Kapfenberg.

Hála moved to Austria in 2000, playing for HC TWK Innsbruck. After two seasons, he spent one season with the Vienna Capitals and EHC Black Wings Linz before joining Graz 99ers in 2004. In March 2008 he left Graz 99ers and moved to the Austrian Nationalliga with EC Wattens, after only 6 months he left Wattens and moved to SV Silz.

Since 2014 he is sport director at the new founded hockey team HC Steelers Kapfenberg.

Hála has dual Czech and Austrian citizenship.

External links

1972 births
Living people
EHC Black Wings Linz players
Czech ice hockey defencemen
Graz 99ers players
Motor České Budějovice players
Sportspeople from České Budějovice
HC Tábor players
HC TWK Innsbruck players
Vienna Capitals players
Czech expatriate ice hockey people
Expatriate ice hockey players in Austria
Czech expatriate sportspeople in Austria
Czechoslovak ice hockey defencemen
Czech emigrants to Austria